There are 531 species of Fish in Pakistan. 233 of them are of fresh water. Mahseer is Most of time this fish came to the city's Walter such as drains and also in the river and lakes the national fish of Pakistan. 
Here is a list of these fishes;

Notopterus notoperus
Notopterus chitala
Naziritor zhobensis
Triplophysa stoliczkai - Deosai only
Diptyichus maculatus - Deosai only
Ptychobarbus conirostis - Deosai only

Family Cyprinidae

[[Naziritor Zhobensis<http://www.fishbase.org/summary/62751></ref>]] - Mahasher "(National fish of Pakistan)"
Labeo rohita - Rohu
Catla catla - Thela/theri Fish
Labeo calabasu - Dahi

Family Clupeidae
Gudusia chapra
Tenualosa ilisha

Family Chandidae
 Channa marulius
 Channa striata
 Channa punctata
 Channa gachua

Spiny-rayed fishes

Colisa lalia
 Colisa fasciata
 Oreochromis mossambicus
 Badis badis
 Sicamugil cascasia
 Glossogobius giuris
 Chanda nama
 Chanda baculis
 Nandus nandus
 Chanda ranga

Exotic species
Salmo trutta - Brown trout
Oncorhynchus mykiss - Rainbow trout
European Carp
Cyprinus carpio - Also known as Common Carp
Chinese Carps
 Ctenopharyngodon idella -Grass carp 
Hypophthalmichthys molitrix - Silver carp
Hypophthalmichthys nobilis -Big head carp

References

Fish of South Asia
 
Fishing in Pakistan
Pakistan